Stammham is a municipality  in the district of Eichstätt in Bavaria in Germany.

History
During the French invasion in Russia (1812) six men of Stammham lost their lives. 17 people died from cholera in 1873. During the First World War 26 men lost their lives. 1921 / 1922: electrification. During the Second World War 58 people lost their lives.

References

Eichstätt (district)